Cryptolechia eningiella is a moth in the family Depressariidae. It was described by Plötz in 1880. It is found in Gabon.

References

Moths described in 1880
Cryptolechia (moth)